Arthur Tindall Briarly Browne was Dean of Ontario from 1945 to 1964.

Browne was educated at  Trinity College, Toronto and ordained in 1924.  After curacies in Guelph and Toronto he was the incumbent at St John Norway  before his appointment as Dean.

References

Trinity College (Canada) alumni
Deans of Ontario